Fonelas is a municipality located in the province of Granada, Spain. According to the 2006 census (INE), the city has a population of 1145 inhabitants.

References

Municipalities in the Province of Granada